The 1862 Grand National was the 24th renewal of the Grand National horse race that took place at Aintree near Liverpool, England, on 12 March 1862.

The race was marred by the only recorded human fatality in the history of the race when Jame's Wynne suffered chest injuries from which he died hours after the race.

Finishing Order

Non-finishers

References

 1862
Grand National
Grand National
19th century in Lancashire
March 1862 sports events